Spiral is the fifth novel in the Tunnels Series, written by Roderick Gordon and Brian Williams. It continues the story of Will Burrows in his struggle against the Styx, who have been a major and pernicious influence throughout mankind's history. Spiral was published in the United Kingdom by Chicken House on 1 September 2011; publication in the US followed on 1 May 2012.

Plot summary

Part One: The Phase

After the events of Closer, Colonel Bismarck, deprogrammed by an explosion during the attack on the Bank of England, decides to help defeat the Styx, and joins Will and Drake at Parry's estate. Drake introduces Will and Chester to three retired commandos living at Parry's estate: "Sparks" Sweeney, who was surgically altered to have enhanced senses and faster reaction times, Danforth, a genius who worked in defense electronics, and Jiggs, who is very good at hiding. Will also meets Parry's gardener, Old Wilkie, and his granddaughter Stephanie. The people of the estate watch for Styx presence, and eliminate the Dark Light conditioning with the help of a device known as the Purger, invented by Danforth. The Purger causes a Darklit person to repeat part of their programming, and Elliott, who is able to speak Styx, finds that Chester has been programmed to call the Styx and report their location. Bartleby and Colly, the Hunters, are engaged in a hunt near the estate, when they encounter two of the Styx soldiers called Limiters spying on the manor. The Limiters wound Colly, and kill Bartleby. Will and the group decide to leave when Mrs. Burrows detects Limiters entering the estate. They escape, only to be cornered by Eddie the Styx, who reveals that the Limiters, rogues like him, are under his control, he was the one Chester was reporting to, and that he saved Emily Rawls, Chester's mother, from being used as a terrorist by the Styx. After much hesitation and discussion he decides he must tell them of the Phase. Meanwhile, in the Colony, the Second Officer begins to worry, as the Styx are neglecting the Colonists to focus on their Topsoil plans. Many people have been moved to an unruly and violent shantytown in the North Cavern to make room for the New Germanian army, and people are disappearing. Topsoil, various terrorist attacks are made by Darklit people who have had bombs surgically implanted within them, and these "human bombs" kill foreign politicians to stir up hatred of Britain. At a factory bought by the Old Styx, the Rebecca Twins have brought several hundred humans and Darklit them to render them brain-dead, perfect hosts for the Phase. They have also brought the Styx's females, who are undergoing part of the Styx's life cycle called the Phase. The Styx are revealed to be an insect species with a unique trait: at infrequent intervals (hundreds or thousands of years apart), the Styx women grow a pair of insect limbs and a mosquito-like ovipositor, used to insert egg sacs into human hosts. From each egg sac, thirty Styx larvae hatch and eat the host from the inside, also absorbing the host's genetic code, explaining why the Styx so closely mimic humans. Styx females who haven't gone through puberty, such as the Rebecca Twins, only experience back pain and minor bleeding where the insect limbs would grow if they were old enough to join in the Phase. Eddie also reveals that in the event the Warrior Class was killed, the Armagi would be released. The Armagi are capable of adapting to all environments, with three legs on land, fins and gills for water, or wings for air. The most horrifying aspect is that they can regenerate their entire body from just a single cell, making them nearly impossible to kill. Upon learning this, Drake and them decide they must take action. They set up headquarters in a military base known as the Complex, bomb shelter for the UK High Command dating back to the Great War. As a newscast reveals, strong anger has arisen worldwide over the human bomb attacks originating from Britain, and the United States and other countries cut off their connections to Britain, which closes its borders and puts itself under martial law. Underground, the Styx abandon the Colony and seal the exits after evacuating the people of the shantytown to use as hosts for the Phase. Finally, Eddie is brought back to base where  Elliott angrily attacks him.

Part Two: Maelstrom

Elliott is examined by Danforth to make sure that she isn't being affected by the Phase, as it is uncertain whether or not she can take part in it as a Styx/human hybrid. Danforth announces that she should be safe for now, although that may change when she finishes puberty. In the Colony, the First Officer decides to quit after someone tries to burn the Colony's police station down. His last act before promoting the Second Officer to head the Colony's police is to set the prisoners in the Hold free. Topsoil, Elliott and Stephanie bond as the group tries to think of ways to find the Phase. They decide to use Drake's computer program to find where people are being Darklit, but cannot think of a place high enough to survey the entire country until Sergeant Finch, the Complex's caretaker, suggests the BT Tower in London. Danforth creates mobile Dark Light detectors out of the Geiger counters lying around the Complex, which Parry distributes to the Old Guard, an organization of ex-commandos that he can call upon in a time of need. The group travels to London via a Chinook helicopter and a disused subway line meant to ferry High Command to the Complex if war broke out. At the Tower they direct the Old Guard searchers to where Dark Light activity is detected, which is everywhere as the Styx are trying to destabilize England to make way for their invasion by starting riots. When one of the Old Guard finds a factory in Slough guarded by Limiters, New Germanians, and Darklit Topsoil soldiers, Parry decides to have the Old Guard attack there.

Part Three: Assault

The Rebecca Twins' argument over Rebecca Two's crush on Captain Franz is interrupted by a phone call warning them about the impending attack. They leave the factory, taking with them two of the Styx women, Vane and Alex, a pair of twins who were role models to the Rebecca Twins as they grew up. The Old Guard's attack on the factory goes almost flawlessly, wiping out the Warrior Larvae and the Styx women. To guard against the Armagi, they use incendiaries to destroy the factory. Watching the explosion, Vane, Alex, and Rebecca Two are despondent, but, as the mysterious warning call turns out to have come from Danforth, he had told Rebecca One what to do to ensure the spread of the Warrior Class: Rebecca One and Vane will go into the inner world, while Rebecca Two and Alex will stay Topsoil to induce the older Styx girls who may be far enough along in puberty to join the Phase. When the group returns to the complex, they review the security camera footage from the factory, where they discover the Rebecca Twins' escape. Meanwhile, Chester notices that his mother isn't acting normal. When the group asks Danforth to trace the call that warned the Rebecca Twins, he tells them that he made the call. He became convinced that the Styx were more highly evolved than humans after he translated the Book of Proliferation, a Styx text about the Phase that Eddie gave the group. Embittered by the government exiling him to Parry's estate in exchange for all his hard work for them during the Cold War, he tells them that the Styx are making him the director of their research efforts in exchange for him giving Rebecca One the idea about the inner world. He tells them that Emily Rawls, whom he Darklit, will cover his escape with a suicide vest. As Danforth flees, Jeff Rawls, convinced that he can persuade his wife to stand down, approaches Emily Rawls. She responds by detonating herself, collapsing the only way out of the Complex. Elsewhere, Rebecca Two and her grandfather, the Old Styx, have taken over a health spa in Kent, and are using it to breed more Warrior Larvae and induce the older Styx girls. Meanwhile, in the Complex, the mood is dire: they, the only ones who know that the Phase is still going on, are cut off from the outside world and only have two weeks worth of air left. With their time almost up, Drake and Eddie formulate a desperate plan: use the explosives stored in the Complex to blast through the side of the mountain. While the group fetches the explosives, Parry reveals that the Complex is being used to store obsolete nuclear bombs. In the inner world, Rebecca One arrives to learn that the high levels of UV light in the inner world has greatly accelerated the Styx life cycle: Vane has implanted egg sacs in over 300 humans in one day, the Warrior Larvae are already hatching, and Vane has grown two additional ovipositors and pairs of insect limbs. Topsoil, the group's plan works, and they escape the Complex. Parry's reveal of the nuclear weapons has given Drake an idea: use two of the devices to seal the passageways to the inner world.

Part Four: Nuclear

Half of the group (Drake, Mrs. Burrows, Sweeney, Jiggs, Will, Elliott, Colonel Bismarck, and Colly) use a stolen British Gas van to gain access to the house formerly owned by the Burrows family before their disappearance, and, more importantly, the tunnel to the Colony beneath it. When the group reaches the Colony, they arrive just in time to help the new First Officer and the freed prisoners overthrow the Governors, Colonists appointed by the Styx to positions of power as the Styx's puppets. While in the Colony, Mrs. Burrows decides to stay in the Colony, as she is blind, as well as Colly, who is pregnant with Bartleby's kittens. Also, Drake reveals that he possesses a second weapon of mass destruction: a virus that kills all mammals, including humans and Styx, that he stole from the Laboratories before he destroyed them. In return, the Colonists provide them with transport to the Deeps, where the Pore leading to the inner world is located. At the Pore, the group steals a Coprolite digger from the Limiters, who were using the Coprolites as slaves to dig a tunnel to the inner world. The group then use the digger and some mini-rockets designed by Drake to travel to the inner world. After they have planted the nuclear weapons, the group is about to exit the inner world when they are ambushed by Rebecca One, Vane, and a patrol of Limiters, killing Colonel Bismarck. Jiggs evens the odds when he emerges from hiding and kills one of the Limiters before being wrestled into the void by another, distracting the Styx long enough for Sweeney to kill the other Limiters. Seeing victory turn to defeat, Rebecca One tries to kill her old nemesis, Will, but Drake wrestles her into the void before she can shoot Will. Sweeney takes Vane hostage as a guard against Styx reinforcements. As Rebecca One and Drake fight as they fall through the void, Drake, thinking he is dying, detonates the explosives, presumably killing both of them and sealing the inner world. The electromagnetic pulse from the blasts overloads the circuitry in Sweeney's head, killing him. As he falls, he crushes the test tube containing the virus, releasing it into the inner world. The virus kills all of the mammals, humans, and Styx in the inner world except Will and Elliott, who were vaccinated for it in the Complex. Topsoil, while the other half of the group searches unsuccessfully for the site of the Phase, Chester has fallen into a deep depression over the deaths of his parents.

Epilogue

Rebecca Two's mourning over her twin sister's death is interrupted as the Armagi begin to hatch.

References

External links
 Official Website

2009 British novels
2009 science fiction novels
British science fiction novels
British young adult novels
Children's science fiction novels
Fictional parasites and parasitoids
Hollow Earth in fiction
Nazi fugitives in popular culture
Novels set in subterranea
Terrorism in fiction
The Chicken House books